The Golden Sheaf Award for the best Research production is presented by the Yorkton Film Festival.

History
In 1947 the Yorkton Film Council was founded.  In 1950 the first Yorkton Film Festival was held in Yorkton, Saskatchewan, Canada.  During the first few festivals, the films were adjudicated by audience participation through ballot casting and winners were awarded Certificates of Merit by the film festival council.  In 1958 the film council established the Yorkton Film Festival Golden Sheaf Award for the category Best of Festival, awarded to the best overall film of the festival.  Over the years various additional categories were added to the competition.  As of 2020, the Golden Sheaf Award categories included: Main Entry Categories, Accompanying Categories, Craft Categories, and Special Awards.

In 2004 the Golden Sheaf Award for best Research production was added to the Craft Categories of the film festival competition. The winner of this award is determined by a panel of jurors chosen by the film council.   The award "recognizes the contribution and role of the researcher in documentary production" and is awarded for the best "content/story research and/or archival stock shot research".

Winners

2000s

2010s

2020s

References 

Awards established in 2004
Yorkton Film Festival awards